Jean Robert René de Cotret,  (February 20, 1944 – July 9, 1999) was a Canadian politician.

Robert de Cotret was the President and CEO of The Conference Board of Canada from 1976-78 before being elected to the House of Commons of Canada in a 1978 by-election. He was elected as the Progressive Conservative Member of Parliament (MP) for Ottawa Centre, and was one of the few francophone MPs in the Tory caucus.

Despite the Tory victory in the 1979 general election, Robert de Cotret lost his seat. In need of French-Canadian Cabinet ministers, Prime Minister Joe Clark appointed de Cotret to the Senate of Canada and to Cabinet as Minister of Industry, Trade and Commerce in Clark's minority government.

When the government was defeated in a motion of non-confidence, a new election was called for February 18, 1980. De Cotret resigned his Senate seat in order to run for a seat in the House of Commons in the riding of Berthier—Maskinongé, but was defeated in the 1980 election along with the Clark government.

He ran again in the 1984 election, and was elected along with a Progressive Conservative majority government led by Brian Mulroney. Mulroney appointed de Cotret to Cabinet as President of the Treasury Board. In 1987, de Cotret became Minister of Regional Industrial Expansion, and reassumed the Treasury Board portfolio in 1989. In 1990, he became Minister of the Environment and then Secretary of State for Canada in 1991.

Robert de Cotret retired from Cabinet in January 1993 and did not run in the 1993 election.

External links
 
 Robert de Cotret fonds, Library and Archives Canada

1944 births
1999 deaths
Canadian senators from Ontario
Members of the 21st Canadian Ministry
Members of the 24th Canadian Ministry
Members of the House of Commons of Canada from Ontario
Members of the King's Privy Council for Canada
Politicians from Ottawa
Progressive Conservative Party of Canada MPs
Progressive Conservative Party of Canada senators
20th-century Canadian economists